Marchukovskiy is a rural locality (a khutor) in Dubrovskoye Rural Settlement, Kikvidzensky District, Volgograd Oblast, Russia. Its population was 1 as of 2010.

Geography 
Marchukovsky is located on Khopyorsko-Buzulukskaya plain, on the left bank of the Buzuluk River, 25 km southwest of Preobrazhenskaya (the district's administrative centre) by road. Alsyapinsky is the nearest rural locality.

References 

Rural localities in Kikvidzensky District